Bosisto is a surname. Notable people with the surname include:

 Glyn Bosisto (1899–1990), Australian lawn bowler
 Joseph Bosisto (1827–1898), Australian chemist and politician
 Will Bosisto (born 1993), Australian cricketer